Live in California 74 is a live DVD of the first California Jam concert performance from Deep Purple released in 2005. It was recorded and aired live by ABC-TV on 6 April 1974 at the Ontario Motor Speedway near Los Angeles, California. This concert was one of the first ever music concerts issued on videotape and laser disc in 1981 under the title California Jam in Japan and the UK.

This is the first official release on DVD of the complete concert. "Lay Down, Stay Down" was not included on the original video release. The camera angles are also different from the original 1981 release, from which two songs are provided as bonus items.

The first four songs are from the newly released album Burn. Other songs are 
from the Made in Japan setlist. "Smoke on the Water", "Space Truckin'" and also "Lazy" and "The Mule", which are played as intro and outro during "You Fool No One".

Deep Purple continued to perform concerts worldwide, including an appearance at the 1974 'California Jam', a televised concert festival that also included many other prominent bands. At the moment Deep Purple were due to appear, Ritchie Blackmore locked himself in his dressing room and refused to go onstage. Previous performers had finished early, and it was still not sunset, the time at which the band had originally been scheduled to start. Blackmore felt this would dull the effect of the band's light show.  After ABC brought in a sheriff to arrest him, Blackmore agreed to perform. At the culmination of the performance, he destroyed several of his guitars and threw one of his amplifier stacks off the edge of the stage. He also struck one of the ABC cameras five times with a guitar and, in recorded footage, can be seen arranging for his road crew to set off a pyrotechnic device in one of his amplifiers, creating a large fireball that was quickly extinguished. The band quickly exited the venue by helicopter, avoiding fire marshals, police officers and ABC executives.

Track listing
"Intro" - 1:27
"Burn" (Ritchie Blackmore, Jon Lord, Ian Paice, David Coverdale) - 7:30
"Might Just Take Your Life" (Blackmore, Lord, Paice, Coverdale) - 5:54
"Lay Down, Stay Down" (Blackmore, Lord, Paice, Coverdale) - 5:11
"Mistreated" (Blackmore, Coverdale) - 12:12
"Smoke on the Water" (Blackmore, Ian Gillan, Roger Glover, Lord, Paice) - 8:54
"You Fool No One" (Blackmore, Lord, Paice, Coverdale) - 19:07
"Space Truckin' " (Blackmore, Gillan, Glover, Lord, Paice) - 25:39

Bonus tracks
"Burn" - 8:21
"Might Just Take Your Life" - 5:02

Archive preview
Live in Concert 72/73
"Highway Star" (Blackmore, Gillan, Glover, Lord, Paice) - 7:27

Personnel
Deep Purple
Ritchie Blackmore: guitar
David Coverdale: lead vocals
Glenn Hughes: bass, vocals
Jon Lord: organ, keyboards
Ian Paice: drums

Accolades 

(*) designates unordered lists.

Certifications

References

External links
 Live At The California Jam 1974 Review

Deep Purple video albums
2005 live albums
2005 video albums
Live video albums
Deep Purple live albums